The Reston Group is a Silurian to Devonian lithostratigraphic group (a sequence of rock strata) in the Southern Uplands terrane of southern Scotland and northernmost England. The name is derived from Reston in the Scottish Borders. The rocks of the Reston Group have also previously been referred to as 'Lower Old Red Sandstone and Lavas'

References

Silurian System of Europe
Devonian System of Europe
Geology of England
Geology of Scotland
Geological groups of the United Kingdom
Geologic formations of the United Kingdom